Grace Lynne Haynes is an American visual artist whose artwork has appeared in numerous solo and group exhibitions; as well as in publications, including multiple appearances on the cover of The New Yorker.

Education 
In 2017, Haynes graduated from the ArtCenter College of Design with a BFA. Haynes is currently pursuing her MFA at the Mason Gross School of the Arts.

Art career

New Yorker cover 
Haynes' artwork graced the cover of the Aug 3–10, 2020 issue of The New Yorker. The new portrait of abolitionist Sojourner Truth, painted for the cover story of The New Yorker, is titled "Sojourner Truth, Founding Mother." The painting and the feature is an homage to Truth in honor of the 100th anniversary of the ratification of the 19th Amendment.

References 

Living people
21st-century American women artists
American women painters
Art Center College of Design alumni
The New Yorker people
Year of birth missing (living people)